Enderby is a surname. Notable people with the surname include:

Samuel Enderby (1717–1797), founder of the whaling company Samuel Enderby & Sons
Samuel Enderby Junior (1756–1829), son of the founder of the whaling company Samuel Enderby & Sons
Charles Enderby (1798–1876), grandson of the founder of the whaling company Samuel Enderby & Sons
Kep Enderby (1926–2015), Australian Esperantist and former politician
Pamela Enderby (born 1949), British speech therapist and academic